Deleted Scenes from the Cutting Room Floor is the debut album by Dutch singer Caro Emerald. The album was conceived, written and produced as a studio project by David Schreurs, Vincent Degiorgio, Jan van Wieringen and Caroline van der Leeuw, and released in the Netherlands with Emerald as the starring artist on 29 January 2010 on their own label Grandmono.

The album was preceded by the hit singles "Back It Up", officially released in the Netherlands on 6 July 2009, and "A Night Like This", released on 11 December 2009.

On 28 June 2011, a new version of the album has been released in Italy, featuring a DVD, three bonus tracks recorded live, and a duet with Italian singer Giuliano Palma in the song "(Vivere) Riviera Life".

Background
The title refers to a figurative term in the film industry. Scenes were cut in the so-called cutting room, where the deleted and therefore unused scenes fell to the cutting room floor. In accordance with the movie theme, David Schreurs and Vincent Degiorgio are credited as creative directors for creating the visual and conceptual world around the music, like artwork and videos. Each song also has an individual synopsis, written by Degiorgio and added as liner notes to the album artwork.

Chart performance
The album debuted at number one in the Dutch Albums Chart. Between 6 February 2010 and 28 August 2010, the album left the top spot for two weeks only, in April and in June, replaced by Jan Smit's Leef and Alain Clark's Colorblind, respectively. On 20 August 2010, Deleted Scenes from the Cutting Room Floor spent its 27th non-consecutive week at number one and became the longest running number-one album in the Netherlands, beating Michael Jackson's Thriller, which held the top spot for 26 weeks in 1983. The album later returned to #1, spending a total of 30 non-consecutive weeks on top of the Dutch Albums Chart.

Moreover, as of September 2011, Deleted Scenes from the Cutting Room Floor spent a total of 77 weeks in the Dutch Top 10, tying with Michael Jackson's Thriller as the longest ever running album there.

In October 2010, the album was released by Dramatico Records in the United Kingdom and in several other European countries. It later reached the Top 5 in Germany (#5), Poland and Austria (#3). In May 2011, the album also reached the Top 10 in the UK Albums Chart, jumping from number 140 during its fourth week in the chart. In July 2011, Deleted Scenes from the Cutting Room Floor peaked at number 4 on the UK Albums Chart. As of May 2013, the album has sold 410,000 copies in the UK. The album was certified Platinum in 2011 by IFPI for sales of over 1,000,000 units in Europe.

Track listing

Italian Platinum Edition

Source:

Charts and certifications

Charts

Certifications

Year-end charts

References 

Caro Emerald albums
2010 debut albums
Jazz albums by Dutch artists
European Border Breakers Award-winning albums